Posterstein is a German municipality in the Thuringian Landkreis of Altenburger Land.

Geography

Neighboring municipalities
Municipalities near Posterstein are Heukewalde, Löbichau, Nöbdenitz, and Vollmershain in the district of Altenburger Land; as well as Paitzdorf and the city of Ronneburg in the district of Greiz.

Municipal arrangement
Stolzenberg is Posterstein's only subdivision.

History
Within the German Empire (1871–1918), Posterstein was part of the Duchy of Saxe-Altenburg.

Culture and landmarks
The Postersteiner Burg, which is lit up at night, is the most important building in the town.  It is also visible north of the community from the Bundesautobahn 4.

Business and transportation
The next train station on the rail line from Posterstein is in Nöbdenitz.

External links
 Burg Posterstein

References

Altenburger Land
Duchy of Saxe-Altenburg